The Bennett Rockshelter is a prehistoric archaeological site in Old Lyme, Connecticut. The Bennett Rockshelter was added to the U.S. National Register of Historical Places in July 1987. The site is located on privately owned woodland.

See also 

 National Register of Historic Places listings in New London County, Connecticut

References 

Archaeological sites on the National Register of Historic Places in Connecticut
National Register of Historic Places in New London County, Connecticut
Lyme, Connecticut